What Are You Waiting For? is a song by British-Irish girl group The Saturdays. It was co-written by MNEK (credited as Uzoechi Emenike), Carla Marie Williams, Annie Rose Yuill (credited as Annie Yuill), Tim Deal, Brian Higgins, Miranda Cooper, Tove Lo (credited as Tove Nilsson), Luke Fritton, Matt Gray, Gavin Harris, Nick Hill and Toby Scott, and produced by Xenomania and Higgins. It was released on 10 August 2014, as the lead and only single from the group's first compilation album, Finest Selection: The Greatest Hits (2014).

The song charted at number 38 in the UK, making it their lowest-charting single to date. However, it peaked at number 25 on the Official UK Sales Chart and number 31 on the Downloads Chart. Consequently, the song became their seventeenth top 20 hit in Scotland and eighteenth consecutive UK Top 40 single.

Music video 
The music video was filmed in Rhodes, Greece. The video shows the group partying whilst holidaying at a resort. Speaking to Capital FM, Frankie Sandford said, 
It was [The Saturdays'] first two-day video shoot which was cool. We got to go away to Rhodes with First Choice, which was great. It just so happens the one that we had to shoot on the beach was stretched over two days, which was no bad thing!
The video was released on 29 June 2014. Capital FM reviewed the video positively and called it a "serious scorcher."

Critical reception 
The song received generally positive reviews from music critics and fans alike. Lewis Corner of Digital Spy found the song to be generic, but hugely enjoyable. He gave the song 3.5 stars out of 5, and commented the song "is dazzling LOL-pop with a brilliantly electrifying chorus, pose-worthy drops and suitably obvious lyrics about having the time of your life." Tina Campbell of Metro said it was "enough to make you want a girlie [sic] holiday, like, right now."

Track listings 
CD single

(Released 11 Aug 2014)
"What Are You Waiting For?" – 3:25
"When Love Takes Over" – 3:51
"Greatest Hits Megamix" – 7:41
"What Are You Waiting For?" (LuvBug Radio Edit) – 3:18

Digital download

(Released 10 Aug 2014)
"What Are You Waiting For?" – 3:25

Digital EP

(Released 10 Aug 2014)
"What Are You Waiting For?" (LuvBug Radio Edit) – 3:18
"When Love Takes Over" – 3:51
"Greatest Hits Megamix" – 7:41
"What Are You Waiting For?" (The Alias Radio Edit) – 3:40
"Greatest Hit Megamix (Video)" – 7:47 Pre-Order Only

The Remixes EP

(Released 10 Aug 2014)
"What Are You Waiting For?" (Belanger Club Mix) – 4:35
"What Are You Waiting For?" (LuvBug Club Mix) – 4:32
"What Are You Waiting For?" (The Alias Club Mix) – 5:22

Revamped Version

"What Are You Waiting For?" – 3:25
"When Love Takes Over" – 3:51
"Greatest Hits Megamix" – 7:41
"What Are You Waiting For?" (LuvBug Radio Edit) – 3:18
"What Are You Waiting For?" (The Alias Radio Edit) – 3:40
"What Are You Waiting For?" (Belanger Club Mix) – 4:35
"What Are You Waiting For?" (LuvBug Club Mix) – 4:32
"What Are You Waiting For?" (The Alias Club Mix) – 5:22

Charts

Release history

References

External links 
 

2014 singles
2014 songs
Fascination Records singles
Polydor Records singles
Rhodes
Song recordings produced by Xenomania
The Saturdays songs
Songs written by Tove Lo
Songs written by Miranda Cooper
Songs written by Carla Marie Williams
Songs written by MNEK